The 2018 Pan American Wrestling Championships was held in Lima, Peru, from 3 to 6 May 2018.

The top three countries in the 18 weight categories scheduled to be held at the 2019 Pan American Games (also in Lima) qualified for the games.

Medal table

Team ranking

Medalists

Men's freestyle

Men's Greco-Roman

Women's freestyle

See also
Wrestling at the 2019 Pan American Games – Qualification

References 

Pan America
Pan American Wrestling Championships
2018 Pan American Wrestling Championships
Sports competitions in Peru
Qualification tournaments for the 2019 Pan American Games
Pan American Wrestling Championships